Commodore may refer to:

Ranks
 Commodore (rank), a naval rank
 Commodore (Royal Navy), in the United Kingdom
 Commodore (United States)
 Commodore (Canada)
 Commodore (Finland)
 Commodore (Germany) or Kommodore
 Air commodore, a rank in the Royal Air Force and other Commonwealth air forces
 Commodore (yacht club), an officer of a yacht club
 Commodore (Sea Scouts), a position in the Boy Scouts of America's Sea Scout program
 Convoy commodore, a civilian in charge of a shipping convoy during the Second World War

Fiction
 The Commodore, a Horatio Hornblower novel by C. S. Forester
 The Commodore (book), a novel in the Aubrey–Maturin series by Patrick O'Brian

Music and music venues
 Commodore Ballroom, a nightclub and music venue in Vancouver, British Columbia
 Commodore Records, a jazz and swing music record label
 Commodores, an American soul/funk band

People
 "The Commodore", the nickname of American entrepreneur Cornelius Vanderbilt (1794–1877)
 "Commodore Kuehnle", the nickname of American entrepreneur and politician Louis Kuehnle (1857–1934)
 Aaron Commodore (1819/20 – 1892), African American politician
 Mike Commodore (born 1979), a Canadian ice hockey player
 Commodore P. Vedder (1838–1910), New York politician
 L. Ron Hubbard (1911–1986), Scientology founder

Places
 Commodore, Pennsylvania, United States
 Commodore Island, a Canadian island in Hudson Bay
Phoenix Park Hotel, hotel built in Washington, D.C., in 1922, known originally as "The Commodore"

Vehicles

Automobiles
 Hudson Commodore, an automobile produced from 1941 to 1952 in the US by Hudson Motor Car Company
 Opel Commodore, an automobile produced from 1967 to 1982 in Germany by Adam Opel AG
 Holden Commodore, an automobile produced from 1978 to 2017 in Australia by the Holden division of General Motors

Ships and boats
 Commodore (shipwreck), an American steamboat shipwrecked off the coast of Florida
 Commodore 17, an American sailboat design
 USS Commodore, the name of various United States Navy ships

Aircraft
 Consolidated Commodore, a flying boat used for passenger travel in the 1930s

Computers
 Commodore International (also named Commodore Business Machines), a computer company that operated from 1954 to 1994
 Commodore 64, an 8-bit home computer introduced in January 1982 by Commodore International
 Commodore USA, a computer company that operated from 2010 to 2013 after purchasing the classic brand name

Other uses
 Several genera or species of brush-footed butterflies, in particular:
 Precis
 Auzakia danava
 Junonia artaxia
 Vanderbilt Commodores, intercollegiate athletics teams for Vanderbilt University